Sweden held a general election on 17 September 2006.

National results
The final results were published on 21 September 2006 by the Swedish Election Authority (Valmyndigheten). Apart from separating the minor parties, there were no big changes to the preliminary count from the election night. 6,892,009 people were eligible to vote in the election. The results are here compared with the 2002 election. There were 5,551,278 valid ballots cast, a turnout of 82%.

Three hours after the polls closed, the result was clear enough for Moderate Party leader Fredrik Reinfeldt to declare himself the victor and for Göran Persson to announce his resignation as Prime Minister and as leader of the Social Democratic Party. The four centre-right parties of Alliance for Sweden formed, as expected, a government with Fredrik Reinfeldt as Prime Minister. The Speaker had asked Reinfeldt to begin this formation on 19 September  but, as is usual, requested the Cabinet of Göran Persson to stay on as a caretaker government until the Riksdag formally elected a new prime minister. The newly elected Riksdag convened on 2 October and the government was presented on 6 October.

The election result is historic in being the worst result for the Social Democrats ever in a general election with universal suffrage (introduced in 1921) and the best result for the Moderates since 1928.

Minor parties, that are not represented in the Riksdag, got a total of 5.7% of the votes, which was an increase of 2.6 percentage points, compared to the 2002 election. Behind this increase lay a great success for the Sweden Democrats, gaining 2.9% (+1.5 percentage points) and thus surpassing the limit (2.5%) for gaining governmental financial support for the next four years. Two new parties, Feminist Initiative (0.7%) and the Pirate Party (0.6%), also contributed to the increase.

Of the 349 elected Riksdag members, 164 (or 47%) were women.

Regional results

Percentage share

By votes

Results by statistical area

Percentage share

By votes

Constituency results

Percentage share

By votes

Municipal summary

Municipal results

Blekinge

Dalarna

Gotland

Gävleborg

Halland

Jämtland

Jönköping

Kalmar

Kronoberg
The leftist bloc won Markaryd by one vote, even though both blocs' results were rounded to 46.5%.

Norrbotten

Skåne

Malmö

Skåne NE

Skåne S

Skåne W

Stockholm

Stockholm (city)

Stockholm County

Södermanland

Uppsala
Although the results for the Moderates and the Social Democrats both were rounded to 26.9%, the Moderates were the largest party in Uppsala Municipality by 15 votes or 26.89% versus 26.88%.

Värmland

Västerbotten

Västernorrland

Västmanland

Västra Götaland

Gothenburg

Västra Götaland E

Västra Götaland N

Västra Götaland S

Västra Götaland W

Örebro

Östergötland

References

General elections in Sweden